Carlsville is an unincorporated community in Door County, within the town of Egg Harbor, Wisconsin, United States. It is on Wisconsin Highway 42 between Sturgeon Bay and Egg Harbor.

History
Carlsville has been in existence since the 1860s and was originally named Karlsville due to the number of men named Karl who lived in the settlement; the name was later anglicized.

References

External links 

Unincorporated communities in Wisconsin
Unincorporated communities in Door County, Wisconsin